Big Hit may refer to

The Big Hit, a 1998 film
Big Hit (album), a 1995 album by Nitzer Ebb
Big Hit Music, a South Korean music record label